Appu Prabhakar is a national award-winning Indian cinematographer who is known for his works in Malayalam, Bengali, Telugu and Nepali films.

Career 
Appu Prabhakar completed a Bachelor of Technology degree from National Institute of Technology Calicut , and studied cinematography at Satyajit Ray Film and Television Institute. He worked as a second camera operator for the Malayalam film Comrade in America (2017). In 2018, he worked as a cinematographer for the short film, Eye Test, for which he received the National Film Award for Best Non-Feature Film Cinematography. He worked on several films in Malayalam, Bengali, and Nepali before making his Telugu film debut with Uma Maheswara Ugra Roopasya (2020).

Filmography

Awards and nominations

References

External links 

Living people
Malayalam film cinematographers
Bengali film cinematographers
Year of birth missing (living people)